Longhoughton railway station served the village of Longhoughton, Northumberland, England from 1847 to 1963 on the East Coast Main Line.

History 
The station was opened on 1 June 1847 by the York, Newcastle and Berwick Railway. The station was situated south of the railway bridge over Station Road. The goods facilities were situated southeast of the up passenger platform, served by all five of the sidings. Longhoughton was one of the stations to close during the Second World War on 5 May 1941, although it was used as an RAF training base during its closure in 1943. The station was reopened on 7 October 1946. Longhoughton station survived while ten other stations closed in 1958 due to its convenience for RAF personnel. It later closed to passengers again on 18 June 1962 and was supposedly closed to all traffic on the same day, although an excursion ran on 3 June 1963. This was the last train to serve Longhoughton station.

References

External links 

 

Disused railway stations in Northumberland
Former North Eastern Railway (UK) stations
Railway stations in Great Britain opened in 1847
Railway stations in Great Britain closed in 1941
Railway stations in Great Britain opened in 1946
Railway stations in Great Britain closed in 1962
1847 establishments in England
1963 disestablishments in England
railway station